Ahmad Javeed Ahwar or جاوید احور is a lawyer, writer and a human rights activist born on May 29, 1987, in Afghanistan. He speaks several languages; Dari his native, English, Pashtu, Dutch and Arabic. In late 2011 he published his first book by the help of Friedrich Ebert Stiftung in Afghanistan under the title of Path Dependency and the International Conferences on Afghanistan: From Bonn 2001 to Bonn 2011".

Education
A.J. Ahwar completed his high school in Ghazni Province in Afghanistan in 2003. Soon after that, he admitted to the Faculty of Law and Political Science in Kabul University, in Kabul Afghanistan in 2004. He graduated from the Diplomacy Department of Political Science Faculty in early 2009. Later, in 2010 he received scholarship for MA in Political Science Program of the OSCE Academy in Bishkek Kyrgyzstan. He spent two months in Switzerland as a research intern with the Geneva Center for Security Policy where he did his primary research on his MA thesis that later developed further by him as the first book of his career on Afghanistan.

Career history
As a Junior student of his faculty he admitted to the research program of the National Center for Policy Research in Afghanistan in 2007. He wrote his final dissertation on Interpelation of Ministers and its Impact on Afghan Government's performances. Later, he worked with Asia Foundation's Office in Afghanistan researching on corruption and common methodologies of research for Afghan research institutes. In 2009, he worked as a Lawyer investigator with the Electoral Complaints Commission in Afghanistan where he in cooperation with his fellow foreign and Afghan colleagues were reviewing electoral complaints against Presidential Elections 2009's nominees. According to him he had a strong contribution to invalidating fraudulent votes of President Hamid Karzai and other nominees of both the Presidential and Provincial Council's nominees. Further, he worked with Afghan Parliament, USAID Afghanistan and Friedrich Ebert Stiftung's office in Afghanistan. Simultaneously he taught different subjects of law at the Dunya University of Higher Education in Afghanistan as a lecturer. Moreover, he was writing for Zamzama Weekly a newspaper widely distributed in Kabul and Ghazni. Plus that he is quoted in tens of articles by several international and European journalists as young analyst, youth activist and anti-Taliban social activist.

Current Activities
Currently, he is writing for The True Pen. The articles in this website are written in English and Persian. Since 2013 is Javeed member of On File, an association of refugee journalists and writers.

See also
Path Dependency and the International Conferences on Afghanistan: From Bonn 2001 to Bonn 2011

References 

Living people
Afghan Tajik people
Afghan male writers
1987 births
Afghan expatriates in Kyrgyzstan